Cabinet of Ivory Coast is the executive branch of the Government of the Ivory Coast.

Governments 

 Achi I government
 Achi II government

References

See also 

 Politics of Ivory Coast

Government of Ivory Coast
Politics of Ivory Coast
Ivory_Coast